Vladimir Arkadevich Krasnopolskiy (14 June 1933 – 23 September 2022) was a Russian film director, producer, and screenwriter.

Biography
Krasnopolskiy was born in Svedlorsk on 14 June 1933 to artist Arkady Vladimirovich Krasnopolsky. In 1955, he graduated from the Faculty of History and Philology at Ural State University and from Gerasimov Institute of Cinematography in 1963. From 1961 to 1963, he was director of the Sverdlovsk Film Studio. In 1964, he became director of Mosfilm. In 1971, he joined the Communist Party of the Soviet Union.

From 1963 to 2015, he directed and wrote all of his films alongside his second cousin, . They went their separate ways in 2016.

Krasnopolskiy died in Moscow on 23 September 2022, at the age of 89.

Filmography
The Slowest Train (1963)
Stewardess (1967)
Not Under the Jurisdiction (1969)
 (1971)
Eternal Call (1973)
 (1991)
 (1994)
 (1996)
 (2001)
 (2002)
 (2003)
 (2007)
 (2009)
Wolf Messing: Who Saw through Time (2009)
House with Lilies (2014)

Distinctions
 (1978)
USSR State Prize (1979)
Lenin Komsomol Prize (1980)
People's Artist of the RSFSR (1983)
Order of Honour (1997)
Order "For Merit to the Fatherland" (2004)

References

1933 births
2022 deaths
Soviet film directors
Russian film directors
Soviet screenwriters
Russian screenwriters
Soviet producers
Russian producers
Recipients of the Order "For Merit to the Fatherland", 3rd class
Recipients of the Order "For Merit to the Fatherland", 4th class
Recipients of the Order of Honour (Russia)
Recipients of the USSR State Prize
Recipients of the Lenin Komsomol Prize
People's Artists of the RSFSR
Ural State University alumni
Gerasimov Institute of Cinematography alumni
Writers from Yekaterinburg